The 2010 Astana Cup was a professional tennis tournament played on outdoor hard courts. It was the first edition of the tournament which was part of the 2010 ATP Challenger Tour. It took place in Astana, Kazakhstan between 23 and 29 August 2010.

ATP entrants

Seeds

 Rankings are as of August 16, 2010.

Other entrants
The following players received wildcards into the singles main draw:
  Yuki Bhambri
  Anton Saranchukov
  Serizhan Yessenbekov

The following players received a special exempt into the singles main draw:
  Michael Venus

The following players received entry from the qualifying draw:
  Samuel Groth
  Sadik Kadir
  Denis Matsukevich
  Nikolaus Moser

The following players received entry as a lucky loser from the qualifying draw:
  Gilad Ben Zvi
  Mikhail Elgin

Champions

Singles

 Igor Kunitsyn def.  Konstantin Kravchuk, 4–6, 7–6(5), 7–6(3)

Doubles

 Mikhail Elgin /  Nikolaus Moser def.  Wu Di /  Zhang Ze, 6–0, 6–4

External links
ITF Search 

Astana Cup
Astana Cup